The Israeli Basketball Premier League Most Improved Player, or Israeli Basketball Super League Most Improved Player, is an award given to the Most Improved Player of each season of the Israeli Basketball Premier League, which is the top-tier level men's professional basketball league in Israel.

Winners

Player nationalities by national team.

References

External links
Israeli League Official website
Eurobasket.com Israeli League Page